Mahuva (Surat) is one of the 182 Legislative Assembly constituencies of Gujarat state in India. It is part of Surat district and is reserved for candidates belonging to the Scheduled Tribes.

List of segments
This assembly seat represents the following segments,

 Mahuva Taluka
 Valod Taluka
 Bardoli Taluka (Part) Villages – Masad, Miyawadi, Rajwad, Nasura, Vadhvaniya, Junvani, Balda, Vanskui, Bhensudla, Nani Bhatlav, Mangrolia, Vadhava, Timbarva, Pipariya, Madhi, Surali, Manekpor, Uva, Karachaka, Hindolia, Kikvad, Gotasa, Sarethi, Moti Bhatlav, Sejvad, Allu, Vankaner, Kanai, Pardi Valod.

Member of Legislative Assembly
2007 - Ishwarbhai Vahia, Indian National Congress
2012 - Mohanbhai Dhodiya, Bharatiya Janata Party

Election results

2022

2017

2012

See also
 List of constituencies of Gujarat Legislative Assembly
 Gujarat Legislative Assembly

References

External links
 

Assembly constituencies of Gujarat
Surat district